Netherland Dwarf is a 2008 Australian short drama film written and directed by David Michod. The film had its world premiere at the Sydney Film Festival on 16 June 2008 and also screened at number of film festivals including Sundance Film Festival and Berlin International Film Festival in 2009.

Plot 
Harry really wants a rabbit. Harry's Dad really wants his wife back. And somehow in the middle of all this wanting, they both seem to have forgotten that they already have each other.

Cast
Jack Egan as Harry
Ewen Leslie as Dad
Mirrah Foulkes as Rebbeca 
Justin Rosniak as Pet shop worker

Filming
Filming took place at Monterey, Sydney, New South Wales, Australia.

Reception

Critical response
Netherland Dwarf has received generally positive reviews from critics, El Vez of short of the week gave film the positive review, stating: "Netherland Dwarf proves once again that sometimes all you need is a hint of emotional resonance to make a captivating and moving short." TGI Film wrote in their review of film, "One of the great things about Netherland Dwarf is the remarkable quality that we so rarely see in short films." Critic Tara Kenny of portable.tv lauded the film for being "simple, sad, sweet and beautiful" she also added, "The emotional resonance of Netherland Dwarf lies in the universal relevance of the familial struggles at its core. With his sweet attentiveness and single-minded desire to own Stampy, the floppy eared bunny, Jack Egan as Harry takes the viewer back to a time when whether to invest in a Hollilop or Netherland dwarf breed of rabbit was easily the most important decision of your lifetime."

Accolades

See also
 Cinema of Australia

References

External links 
 

 https://web.archive.org/web/20130424160701/http://www.aquariusfilms.com.au/index.php/about
 http://www.aquariusfilms.com.au/index.php/download_file/-/view/17

2008 films
Australian drama short films
Australian independent films
2008 short films
Films directed by David Michôd
Films set in Australia
Films shot in Sydney
2000s English-language films